Amjad Hossain ( – 22 March 2015) was a Bangladeshi lawyer and politician from Pabna belonging to Bangladesh Awami League. He was a member of the Jatiya Sangsad.

Biography
Hossain was an organizer of the Liberation War of Bangladesh. After liberation he was elected as a member of the Jatiya Sangsad from Pabna-12 in 1973.

Hossain was married to Jannatul Ferdous. She was a member of the Jatiya Sangsad too. They had two daughters and one son.

Hossain died on 22 March 2015 at the age of 80.

References

People from Pabna District
20th-century Bangladeshi lawyers
1st Jatiya Sangsad members
1930s births
2015 deaths
Awami League politicians
People of the Bangladesh Liberation War
20th-century Pakistani lawyers